Hur Jae (born September 28, 1965) is a South Korean retired basketball coach and former player. His playing and coaching career combined spanned over three decades, beginning during the semi-professional era and coinciding with the establishment of the professional Korean Basketball League (KBL). As one of the most recognizable domestic sports stars of the late 1980s to early 2000s, Hur was nicknamed "The President of Korean Basketball" (Korean: 농구대통령) by Korean fans and the media. At the 1988 Summer Olympics in Seoul, he took the Athlete's Oath with handball player Son Mi-na. 

Hur is widely regarded as the greatest South Korean basketball player of all time, with his prime in the early to mid 1990s. Although his predominant position was at shooting guard, due to his ability to shoot from both inside and outside the paint, he possessed the aggressiveness and physicality to play under the post and the ball handling and passing skills typical of point guards, leading to him being described as the most all-rounded and versatile players in the history of domestic basketball. He is the father of basketball players Heo Ung and Heo Hoon.

Early life and education
Hur is the youngest of four children and has an older brother and two older sisters. Their father, who died in 2010, was a refugee from Sinuiju in present-day North Pyongan Province, North Korea. He graduated from Sangmyung Primary School in 1978, Yongsan Middle School in 1981 and Yongsan High School in 1984. A highly-rated prospect in high school, he was notably the center of a fierce recruiting "war" between Korea University and Chung-Ang University. He ultimately chose Chung-Ang and graduated in 1988.

Playing career

College days
Hur, Kim Yoo-taek and Kang Dong-hee, dubbed the "Hur-Dong-Taek Trio", formed the core of the Chung-Ang University team which dominated college basketball during the 1980s and still regarded as one of the most legendary group of players in Chung-Ang history. Along with center Han Ki-bum, the quartet were credited with breaking the duopoly of Yonsei University and Korea University in college basketball and raising the profile of Chung-Ang's basketball team, especially since the university was better known for producing actors and actresses at that time.

Busan Kia Enterprise (1987–1998)
In 1988, Hur joined Han and Kim at the Busan-based amateur basketball team of Kia Motors, which became Ulsan Hyundai Mobis Phoebus after its parent company bought over Kia. At that time, Kia recruited a large number of Chung-Ang University players, including future Wonju Dongbu Promy coach Kim Young-man, into its team and dominated the main amateur-era competition, the National Basketball Festival (농구대잔치). Kang later joined them and the reunited "Hur-Dong-Taek Trio" played a major role in Kia's continued domination of the National Basketball Festival competition. Hur led the team to win the competition for five years straight (1988–1993) and for another back to back in (1995–1996), and he won the Most Valuable Player (MVP) three times. 

On March 3, 1991, Hur was involved in an infamous brawl during a championship match against Hyundai, the amateur-era predecessor of Jeonju KCC Egis. Early in the first half, he was elbowed by Hyundai's Im Dal-sik. Hur furiously approached Im, pushing him in the head, and Im responded by hitting Hur with a right hand. After both players were ejected, Hur confronted Im again, and Im's teammate, Kim Sung-wook connected with an uppercut to Hur's jaw. Hur suffered a fractured jaw which took 3 months to heal. Both Hur and Im were suspended for 6 months and Kim was suspended for 3 months following the incident. Hur and Im, who later became a coach, have since reconciled.

The Kia team registered as one of the founding teams of the newly-established professional league, the Korean Basketball League. They won the first ever KBL Championship. However, Kia's corporate sponsor was going through financial difficulties due to the 1997 Asian financial crisis, which had severely impacted South Korea. The unstable finances also meant that Kia had difficulty recruiting younger players to replace aging and outgoing key players. The aging team found themselves struggling to keep up with a younger Hyundai team led by Lee Sang-min, Cho Sung-won and Choo Seung-gyun. Kia managed to reach the 1997–98 play-off finals but lost to Hyundai in a close race. Hur was named play-off MVP, the only time the award went to a member of the losing team.

By then, relations with his head coach had deteriorated and Hur was accused of disrupting the team atmosphere, especially after he was charged with drunk driving. He declared that at the end of the 1997–98 season that he would leave Kia regardless of the season's results.

Wonju (1998–2004)
After a decade with Busan Kia Enterprise, Hur was traded to Wonju Naray Blue Bird, now Wonju DB Promy. He formed a tandem together with guard Shin Ki-sung, who had just been drafted that year. With the drafting of center-forward Kim Joo-sung, the newly-renamed Wonju TG Xers became a formidable team and were dubbed "Speed TG" due to a combination of Kim's rebounding and scoring prowess, Shin's speed and shooting accuracy, Hur's experience and versatility and foreign recruit Leon Derricks' physical strength. During the 2002–03 regular season, Hur's playing time was reduced but he played a vital role by boosting team morale and contributing decisive points during the playoffs, especially in TG's hard-fought victory over defending champions Daegu Orions in the final; TG went on to win 4 out of the six games. 

Hur retired at the end of the 2003-04 season. TG Xers retired his number 9 jersey, a legacy inherited by its current successor team Wonju DB Promy. The KBL honored him with a "retirement game", which was sold-out within minutes, for the first time in its history and it featured his former teammates including Kang Dong-hee, Lee Sang-min and Hyun Joo-yup.

National team
Hur competed in two Summer Olympics, earning his best finish of ninth in men's team event at Seoul in 1988. In 1990, Hur set the record for most points in a FIBA World Championship match, a record that still stands to this day, scoring 54 against Egypt in a 117–115 victory for 15th place. He also participated in the 1995 ABC Championship hosted on home soil and was named MVP despite losing to China in the final.

Coaching career
Hur expressed his interest in coaching after retiring and was sent to the United States. He was on the coaching staff of the Pepperdine University men's basketball team.

Jeonju KCC Egis
In 2005, Hur returned to South Korea to become the head coach of KBL team Jeonju KCC Egis. He broke the stereotype of star athletes failing as head coaches by leading the team to two KBL Championship titles, becoming the first former player-turned-coach to have won the Championship as a player and a head coach. During his tenure, he gained a reputation for his astute draft picks and signings such as three-time Defensive Best 5 selectee and "one-club man" Shin Myung-ho, 2013 FIBA Asia Championship All-Tournament selection Kim Ming-goo, six-time domestic rebounding leader center Ha Seung-jin and star point guard Kim Tae-sul.

During the 2013-14 season, in the October 15 game against Ulsan Mobis Phoebus, he went viral for his mispronunciation of the phrase "Is this blocking?" when one of his players had an attempt thwarted by the opponent and referee Hong Ki-hwan had called a block instead of a foul. Hur had been livid with Hong's decision as he felt that his player had been fouled and protested to Hong, although to no avail. The Korean transliteration of "block" is 블락 (beul-lak) and Hur had mispronounced it as 불낙 (bul-nak); the term itself is a portmanteau of 불 from "bulgogi" and 낙 from "octopus" (낙지, nakji) and refers to bulgogi octopus stew. This led to octopus stew-related internet memes circulating and the phrase was parodied by comedians and other athletes, including Hur's own sons, as a term to express extreme discontent over another person's decision. The meme would resurface in 2015 after older son Heo Ung recorded the first block of his career and the clip of Heo Ung's block itself went viral along with the caption "This is a block."

Preparations for the 2014–15 season were interrupted when star rookie Kim Min-goo was seriously injured in a car accident caused by drunk driving. At the 2014 rookie draft, Hur came under intense media scrutiny when his older son, a shooting guard and junior at Yonsei University, declared eligibility early and entered the draft. Pundits speculated whether he would be picking his son to replace Kim as they played in similar positions. In the end, Hur picked Korea University guard Kim Ji-hoo and his son was picked next by Wonju DB Promy. Hur had envisioned a "dream team" helmed by Ha Seung-jin, Kim Min-goo and Kim Tae-sul, who was signed via a two-player trade, but it never materialized due to Kim Min-goo's accident, Kim Tae-sul's slump in form and Ha Seung-jin's frequent injuries.

On February 2015, Hur announced his resignation after the last game of the fifth round, citing the team's poor results and stress affecting his physical health as the reasons. His assistant coach Choo Seung-gyun was named acting coach for the remainder of the season. Jeonju KCC Egis was ranked 9th at that time. 

Hur had steered the team to two Championship titles and six appearances in the playoffs during his ten seasons, accruing 252 wins in 531 games (0.475 win rate) as head coach. Although having a win rate slightly lower than 50%, he has been retrospectively evaluated as one of domestic sport's more successful star players-turned-coaches in terms of silverware, especially in light of his younger counterparts such as Lee Sang-min and Hyun Joo-yup, becoming head coaches of KBL teams but to little success. At the time of his resignation, he was one of only seven KBL-registered head coaches to have recorded 200 or more wins during the regular season and also won a Championship. 

Popular during his playing days, Hur was a polarizing figure as a head coach. He was known for his fiery temperament and propensity for arguing with referees and match officials, resulting in him being fined a number of times for unsporting behavior. During his time at Jeonju KCC Egis, he coached some of the biggest names in domestic basketball such as Choo Seung-gyun, Ha Seung-jin, Kim Tae-sul, Lee Sang-min and Seo Jang-hoon and was popular with his players for his charisma and more liberal management style, a departure from the strict hierarchical culture of the era in which players had little say in team decisions.

South Korean national team
In 2009 and 2011, Hur had brief stints as head coach of the South Korean national team, an appointment he held concurrently with his position at Jeonju KCC Egis. In June 2016, he was named full-time head coach of the national team. Under him, the national team finished third at the 2017 FIBA Asia Cup and won bronze at the 2018 Asian Games. He resigned after the Asian Games and was succeeded by his assistant Kim Sang-shik.

Post-coaching activities
After he resigned as the head coach of the national team, Hur started to appear on entertainment shows. He has dismissed returning to the KBL in a coaching position.

Alongside his former national teammates Seo Jang-hoon and Hyun Joo-yup, Hur was among the earliest retired basketball stars to regularly star on entertainment programs. The trio were active during the late 1990's when basketball rivaled football as the country's most popular sport. Their appearances have been credited with drawing more positive attention to the KBL, especially since the league and its players and coaches had been in the negative spotlight after a series of scandals involving illegal betting, match-fixing and drunk driving from the late 2000's to early 2010's. In June 2022, he and his sons were featured in their own 8-episode reality show Impossible Time (허섬세월) where they spend ten days living on Nokdo, a sparsely-inhabited island only accessible by ferry from the port city of Boryeong.

In May 2022, Hur was appointed chief executive of Dayone Asset Management, the new owners of Goyang Carrot Jumpers, leading him to withdraw from the MBC show Household Mate. Dayone reiterated that he would continue appearing on entertainment programs.

Personal life
In 1992, Hur married sculptor Lee Mi-soo after meeting her during an off-season trip to Busan. They have two sons, Jeonju KCC Egis shooting guard Heo Ung and Suwon KT Sonicboom point guard Heo Hoon. Hur has stated that both sons never formally learned to play basketball from him since he and his wife had been adamantly opposed to them becoming professional athletes. To prevent them from being overshadowed by him, he rarely attended their games or appeared on television programs with them until they had established themselves in the KBL.

In 2020 younger son Heo Hoon won the KBL Most Valuable Player Award and they became the first father-son duo to win an MVP award in the history of domestic basketball; Hur Jae had won the 1997–98 Playoffs MVP and the equivalent MVP award during the amateur era.

Filmography

TV Shows

Web shows

Ambassadorship 
 Public Relations Ambassador for the Fruit of Love Community Chest (2021)

Awards and nominations

References

External links 
FIBA.com profile
IOC 1988 Summer Olympics

1965 births
Living people
Asian Games bronze medalists for South Korea
Asian Games medalists in basketball
Asian Games silver medalists for South Korea
Basketball players at the 1986 Asian Games
Basketball players at the 1988 Summer Olympics
Basketball players at the 1990 Asian Games
Basketball players at the 1994 Asian Games
Basketball players at the 1996 Summer Olympics
Heo clan of Yangcheon
Jeonju KCC Egis coaches
Korean Basketball League players with retired numbers
Korean Basketball League players
Medalists at the 1986 Asian Games
Medalists at the 1990 Asian Games
Medalists at the 1994 Asian Games
Oath takers at the Olympic Games
Olympic basketball players of South Korea
People from Chuncheon
South Korean basketball coaches
South Korean men's basketball players
1990 FIBA World Championship players
Basketball players from Seoul
Ulsan Hyundai Mobis Phoebus players
Wonju DB Promy players
1986 FIBA World Championship players
1994 FIBA World Championship players
Chung-Ang University alumni